Radoslav Zabavník (born 16 September 1980) is a Slovak former professional footballer who played as a defender.

Club career
Zabavník played for MFK Košice and MŠK Žilina in his native country's Corgoň Liga, winning the championship twice with MŠK Žilina. Between 2004 and late 2005, Zabavník played in Bulgaria for PFC CSKA Sofia. He became the first Slovak player to sign a contract with an A PFG club. In the end of 2005, he was sold to Sparta Prague.  In February 2008, Sparta Prague sold Zabavník to Terek Grozny. In December 2009, he was released and signed for 1. FSV Mainz 05 on 1 February 2010. The signing proved to be astute business by Mainz 05 as Zabavník went on to make a string of impressive performances for them cementing his place in the starting eleven.

International career
Zabavník is currently the oldest ever Slovak international debutant since 2003, having played the first game for his country in the 2006 FIFA World Cup qualifier match against Luxembourg at the age of 24 years.

Career statistics

Club

International goals
Scores and results list Slovakia's goal tally first, score column indicates score after Zabavník goal.

References

External links
 
 
 Profile at iDNES 

1980 births
Living people
Sportspeople from Košice
Slovak footballers
Association football fullbacks
Association football central defenders
Slovakia international footballers
Slovakia under-21 international footballers
2010 FIFA World Cup players
FC VSS Košice players
MŠK Žilina players
PFC CSKA Sofia players
AC Sparta Prague players
FC Akhmat Grozny players
1. FSV Mainz 05 players
SV Sandhausen players
Slovak Super Liga players
Russian Premier League players
First Professional Football League (Bulgaria) players
Czech First League players
Bundesliga players
Slovak expatriate footballers
Slovak expatriate sportspeople in the Czech Republic
Expatriate footballers in the Czech Republic
Slovak expatriate sportspeople in Bulgaria
Expatriate footballers in Bulgaria
Slovak expatriate sportspeople in Russia
Expatriate footballers in Russia
Slovak expatriate sportspeople in Germany
Expatriate footballers in Germany